The 1970–71 Ohio State Buckeyes men's basketball team represented Ohio State University during the 1970–71 season. Led by 13th-year head coach Fred Taylor, the Buckeyes finished 20–6 and won the Big Ten title with a 13–1 record in league play.

Roster

Schedule/results

|-
!colspan=9 style=| Regular Season
|-

|-
!colspan=9 style=| NCAA Tournament
|-

Team players in the 1971 NBA Draft

References

Ohio State Buckeyes men's basketball seasons
Ohio State
Ohio State